1 Şişe Aşk (1 Bottle of Love) is the first studio album by Cypriot-Turkish singer Buray. It was released on 14 August 2015 by Sony Music.

Release and content 
1 Şişe Aşk is Buray's first album. It contains 8 songs in total. Bahadır Tanrıvermiş served as the album's music director. All of the pieces in the album were written by Gözde Ançel, and composed by Buray together with Ançel. Buray arranged all of the songs in the album.

Buray explained the production of the album as follows: "My album 1 Şişe Aşk is a result of a 2-year project. Out of hundreds of compositions that we prepared, I chose the ones that were close to my own style and kneaded with my own soul. All of the arrangements were done by me. The lyrics are by Gözde Ançel, and most of the music was made through our collaboration with Gözde. At first, I had no intention of making an album. I had a very enjoyable way of life in Australia and I didn't want to leave it at first. 2 years ago I felt the right time was coming and I let the events flow."

Track listing

Personnel 
 Music director: Bahadır Tanrıvermiş
 Arrangements: Buray Hoşsöz
 Mastering: Martin Pullen
 Mixing: Evripides Evripidou (1), Arzu Aslan (2,3), Buray Hoşsöz (4), Kudret Bayram (5,5,7,8)
 Guitars: Serhan Yasdıman (2)
 Bass guitar: Birkan Şener (2,3,6,7,8), Arif Ulusoy (5)
 Bowed string instruments: Gündem Yaylı Grubu (3,5,6)
 Bowed string instruments orchestration: Halil Er (3,5,6)
 Clarinet: Onur Gedik (7)
 Solo violoncello: Gürhan Nuray (2,5)
 Graphic design: Melek Boçoğlu Yılmaz
 Photographs: Gazi Photography (Melbourne)
 Contact: Gamze Sakallılar

Credits adapted from 1 Şişe Aşks album booklet.

Charts

Release history

References 

2015 debut albums
Turkish-language albums
Sony Music albums